Farahabad-e Kheyl (also Romanized as Faraḩābād-e Kheyl and Faraḩābād Kheyl; also known as Faraḩābād-e Khalīl) is a village in Mazkureh Rural District, in the Central District of Sari County, Mazandaran Province, Iran. At the 2006 census, its population was 277, in 79 families.

References 

Populated places in Sari County